Josh Valentine (born 22 February 1983 in Newcastle in New South Wales) is an Australian rugby union footballer. He currently plays for the US Carcassonne in France. Valentine's usual position is at scrum half.

Career
Valentine played for the Singleton Bulls in his youth. He made his debut for the Queensland Reds against the Crusaders in 2003, he subsequently made his Super 12 debut that season against the Brumbies on his 20th birthday. That year he was named Reds' rookie of the year. At the end of the season, Valentine was named as vice-captain of Australia A, and toured Japan with them as well as participating in the Under 21 World Cup in England. The following year he played games for Australia A in France in November as well as playing for the national team in the under 21 World Cup in Scotland.

After a good season with the Reds in 2006, Valentine was included in the new coach, John Connolly's Wallaby squad. He came off the bench to earn his first Australian cap against England at Sydney's Telstra Stadium. In 2006, Valentine signed a two-year deal to join the New South Wales Waratahs, where he took up Waratahs captain Chris Whitaker's position. Valentine played with the Western Force for the 2009 season and with the ACT Brumbies for the 2010 and 2011 seasons. He has played with the RC Narbonne in France since 2012.

References

External links
Waratahs profile
Western Force Profile

Australian rugby union players
Australia international rugby union players
New South Wales Waratahs players
Queensland Reds players
ACT Brumbies players
Western Force players
People from Newcastle, New South Wales
1983 births
Living people
Rugby union scrum-halves
Expatriate rugby union players in France
US Carcassonne players
Rugby union players from Newcastle, New South Wales